Gabriela Sabatini was the defending champion.

Jennifer Capriati won in the final 6–1, 6–4 against Anke Huber.

Seeds
A champion seed is indicated in bold text while text in italics indicates the round in which that seed was eliminated.

Draw

Finals

Top half

Bottom half

References

External links
 Main draw
 1993 Peters NSW Open draw

1993 Peters NSW Open
1993 WTA Tour